Jericho is a village in Sterling Township, Wayne County, Pennsylvania, United States.

History
The Jericho Post Office was open between 1858 and 1861.

References

Unincorporated communities in Wayne County, Pennsylvania
Unincorporated communities in Pennsylvania
1818 establishments in Pennsylvania